Charlatan is a 2020 Czech-Polish-Irish-Slovak  drama directed by Agnieszka Holland based loosely on the healer Jan Mikolášek (1889–1973), who cured hundreds of people using plant-based remedies. It was selected as the Czech entry for the Best International Feature Film at the 93rd Academy Awards making the February shortlist. It won five awards including Best Film at the 2021 Czech Lion Awards.

Plot
His remedies and prescriptions, although mostly plant-based, included lifestyle and dietary changes. He healed not only poor people from the villages but also many well-known people, including the Czechoslovak President, Antonín Zápotocký. Mikolášek's diagnostic methods and notorious healing got the attention of Czechoslovakia's government. He was finally arrested after strychnine was found in the bodies of two men he had treated.

In real life, Jan Mikolášek was tried and convicted in 1959 of tax and other offenses, but not for murder by strychnine poisoning, was released in 1963, and died in 1973.

Cast
 Ivan Trojan as Jan Mikolášek
  as Young Mikolášek
  as František
  as Johanka
 Jaroslava Pokorná as Mülbacherová
 Miroslav Hanuš as Investigator
  as Member of Secret Service
 Martin Myšička as Father
  as the Judge
 Jan Budař as Bureaucrat
 as Fritz Kiesewetter

Production

The film was a Czech-Irish-Polish-Slovak co-production. The venture included Marlene Film Production (Czech Republic), Kevan Van Thompson, Mike Downey (Chairman of European Film Academy) and Sam Taylor - both from Film & Music Entertainment Ltd (Ireland), Madants (Poland) and Furia Film (Slovakia) Others involved were Czech Television, Barrandov Studio, Studio Metrage, Moderator Inwestycje, Rozhlas a televízia Slovenska, CertiCon, Vladimír a Taťána Maříkovi and Magic Lab.

Shooting started on 1 April 2019 at Mladá Boleslav Prison. Principal photography took 36 Days. Shooting concluded in July 2019. The film entered postproduction on 4 July 2019.

Release
The film premiered at Berlin International Film Festival on 27 February 2020. It was set to enter distribution for Czech cinemas on 26 March 2020. Due to the COVID-19 pandemic, distribution was delayed to 20 August 2020. The film was viewed by 59,073 people during its first weekend in Czech Theatres. Despite strong Competition the film had strong attendance during its second weekend with 37 000 People while being narrowly beaten only by Tenet. It was chosen to be part of 26th Kolkata International Film Festival January 2021 lineup and shown on 11 January 2021 at Cinema Centenary Building of West Bengal government.

Reception
The film has received generally positive reviews from Czech critics holding 74% at Kinobox.cz based on 12 reviews. The film was also positively received by foreign reviews holding  at Rotten Tomatoes based on  reviews. The critics consensus says: "Charlatan's slightly dry approach is offset by unique filmmaking flourishes and a fascinating story that make this an engaging, albeit unusual, biopic."

"Charlatan is a film that does not quite satisfy the curiosity it arouses", states Peter Bradshaw in his review for The Guardian from the Berlinale. "Was Mikolášek a 'charlatan'? Rightly or wrongly, the movie is vehement that he was not. The drama in no way resides in any lingering ambiguity. This Mikolášek is a man of principle and intuitive genius who presides over a flourishing practice. (...) He is played with fiercely controlled stoicism by the veteran Czech actor Ivan Trojan, whose son Josef plays the young Mikolášek. (...) This is a forceful, capable movie with an interesting story to tell but its potency consists in a handful of gripping episodes, the most startling being when the young Mikolášek has developed a love of herbs and a vocation for healing."

Accolades 
On 3 August 2020 Charlatan was chosen to be part of Telluride Film Festival 2020 lineup. It was also recommended for a nomination for the 33rd European Film Awards by European Film Academy.

It was nominated for 14 Czech Lion Awards, including the Best film. Ivan Trojan won Czech Film Critics' Award for Best Actor and Agnieszka Holland for Best Director.

On 6 March 2021, Charlatan won five Czech Lion Awards including Best Picture, Best Director (Agnieszka Holland), and Best Lead Actor (Ivan Trojan).

See also
 List of submissions to the 93rd Academy Awards for Best International Feature Film
 List of Czech submissions for the Academy Award for Best International Feature Film

References

External links
 
 Charlatan  at CSFD.cz 

2020 films
Czech historical drama films
2020s Czech-language films
2020 biographical drama films
Films directed by Agnieszka Holland
Czech LGBT-related films
2020 LGBT-related films
LGBT-related drama films
2020s historical drama films
Czech biographical drama films
Czech Lion Awards winners (films)
Czech films based on actual events